Robert Bagguley (10 July 1873 – 8 October 1946) was an English first-class cricketer active 1891–1900 who played for Nottinghamshire. He was born in Ruddington; died in Bradmore. Bagguley was only 17 when he made his first-class debut for Nottinghamshire in 1891 and took six for 74 bowling against Sussex at Hove.

References

1873 births
1946 deaths
English cricketers
Nottinghamshire cricketers
Marylebone Cricket Club cricketers